Vitz is a surname. Notable people with the surname include:

Carl Vitz (1883–1981), American librarian and author
Paul Vitz (born 1935), American psychologist